Abel Gigli Mohamed (born 16 August 1990) is a professional footballer who plays as a defender for Italian Serie D club Ravenna and the Somalia national team. Born in Italy, he represents the Somalia national team.

Club career

Parma
Gigli made his Serie A debut for Parma on 25 April 2010 in a game against Bologna when he came on as a substitute in the 43rd minute for Massimo Paci. In mid-2010 he was sold to Atletico Roma on a co-ownership deal.

On 31 August 2010 he joined Viareggio on a temporary deal.

He was bought back by Parma on 24 June 2011. In July 2011 he joined Fondi on loan.

On 11 July 2013 Gigli was signed by Savona F.B.C. However, on 1 August he was signed by Slovenian club ND Gorica. The paperwork was completed on 9 August.

On 9 August 2014 he was signed by Serie B club Crotone.

Maribor
On 1 July 2015 he returned to Slovenia, signing a two-year contract with Maribor. He left the club on 4 February 2016.

Lupa Roma
On 20 September 2016 Lupa Roma signed Gigli on a free transfer.

Gozzano
After without a club for more than six months, Gigli was signed by Gozzano in March 2018. The club won the group stage of 2017–18 Serie D, as well as participated in the playoffs: the Scudetto Dilettanti. Gigli played two out of possible three matches in the playoffs for the losing semi-finalists.

Ravenna
On 5 July 2022, he moved to Ravenna.

International career
Gigli made his debut for Somalia on 5 September 2019 in a 2022 FIFA World Cup qualification match against Zimbabwe, coming on as the first-half substitute.

Career statistics

International
Scores and results list Somalia's goal tally first.

Notes

References

External links
 
 
 PrvaLiga profile 

1990 births
Living people
People from Busto Arsizio
Italian people of Somali descent
Italian sportspeople of African descent
Sportspeople from the Province of Varese
Footballers from Lombardy
Association football defenders
Italian footballers
People with acquired Somali citizenship
Somalian footballers
Somalia international footballers
Somalian people of Italian descent
Serie A players
Serie B players
Serie C players
Lega Pro Seconda Divisione players
Serie D players
Parma Calcio 1913 players
Atletico Roma F.C. players
F.C. Esperia Viareggio players
S.S. Racing Club Fondi players
S.S. Chieti Calcio players
F.C. Crotone players
Lupa Roma F.C. players
A.C. Gozzano players
U.S. Folgore Caratese A.S.D. players
Rimini F.C. 1912 players
A.S.D. Cjarlins Muzane players
Alma Juventus Fano 1906 players
Ravenna F.C. players
Slovenian PrvaLiga players
ND Gorica players
Somalian expatriate footballers
Italian expatriate footballers
Italian expatriate sportspeople in Slovenia
Somalian expatriate sportspeople in Slovenia
Expatriate footballers in Slovenia